is a Japanese singer managed by the male idol talent agency Johnny and Associates. He is a member of the boyband A.B.C-Z.

Career
On September 8, 2004, having passed an audition for Johnny's Jr., Ryosuke Hashimoto became a Johnny's trainee.  In the summer of 2005, he was selected as a member of Johnny's Jr. unit J.J. Express.  In 2008, he was selected to form the group TOP3 together with Yuma Sanada and Yuki Nozawa.

On August 29, 2008, Ryosuke Hashimoto was added to the Johnny's Jr. group A.B.C., renamed to A.B.C-Z when he joined.

In early 2009, the entertainment magazine Myojo named Ryosuke Hashimoto the number one "Jr. I Would Like to Be My Boyfriend". He also won the first place in the "Best Looking" category and the second place as the one "I Would Like to Kiss".

On February 1, 2012, Ryosuke's group A.B.C-Z had a major debut with a DVD titled Za ABC ~5stars~.

In 2012, Ryosuke acted in a television series titled Sprout, broadcast starting July 7 on NTV.

Since April 6, 2013, he is appearing in a television drama series called Bad Boys J.

Personal life
On July 31, 2008, the September issue of the tabloid magazine BUBKA published a paparazzi article about Ryosuke Hashimoto spotted at the cinema with Kanna Arihara from the girl group Cute. They went to see the movie Hana Yori Dango: Final. The publication might become the reason for Kanna's disappearance from Cute's activities in early 2009 and her subsequent retirement from the entertainment industry to "return to the life of a normal girl". Cute fans thought that she was pressured to leave by her talent agency. According to a women's weekly tabloid magazine reporter, the publication itself would not lead to Kanna's retirement, but she continued to date Ryosuke in secret after that. Instead of being punished after the scoop in BUBKA as rumors expected, on August 29, 2008, Ryosuke Hashimoto was added to the Johnny's Jr. group A.B.C., renamed to A.B.C-Z when he joined.

Johnny's Jr. groups 
 J.J. Express
 TOP3
 A.B.C-Z

Solo Song 

 Stay with me (A.B.Sea Market)
 Crazy about you (ABC Star Line)
 Love To Love You (5 Performer-Z)
 秘密の愛
 DANCE
 hazy love
 One by One

Solo concert 

 A.B.C-Z Ha"SS"hy Concert (2015)
 ハシツアーズ 〜もうかわいいなんて言わせない〜 (2016)
 橋本ソロ充観とく？～りょうちゃんとぱりぴ～ (2017)

Filmography

Variety shows 
  (2004–)
  (October 2007 – March 2008, Fuji TV)
ABChanZoo 「えびチャンズ」(2013.07.21 – present)
Derusata (With Tsukada Ryoichi, 2016–present)

TV dramas 
  (July 7, 2012 – September 29, 2012, Nippon Television) as Naoharu Takigawa
  (April 6, 2013–present, Nippon Television) as Hiro
Magical Boy Cherry's (June 21 – September 27, 2014, TV Tokyo) as Tetsu Dogami
Iyashiya Kiriko no Yakusoku (August 3 – September 25, 2015, Fuji TV) as Haruki Aoi

Movie 
 Bad Boys J The Movie (2013)
 The 47 Ronin in Debt (2019), Takebayashi Takashige

Stage Play 

 ルードウィヒ・B (2014)
 Coin Locker Babies (2016 & 2018)
 Death Trap (2017)
 Mitsubachi to Enrai (2018)
 Every Good Boy Deserves Favour (2019)

Commercials 
  by Nissin Food Products Co., Ltd. (2009)

Awards and recognitions 
 Myojo
 2009
 : 1st place
 : 1st place
 : 2nd place

References

External links 
 A.B.C-Z's profile on Johnny and Associates' official site
 Member profiles on A.B.C.-Z's official site

1993 births
Johnny & Associates
Japanese male idols
Japanese child singers
Japanese male pop singers
Living people
Musicians from Chiba Prefecture
21st-century Japanese singers
21st-century Japanese male actors
21st-century Japanese male singers